ISO 3166-2:FI is the entry for Finland in ISO 3166-2, part of the ISO 3166 standard published by the International Organization for Standardization (ISO), which defines codes for the names of the principal subdivisions (e.g. provinces or states) of all countries coded in ISO 3166-1.

Currently for Finland, ISO 3166-2 codes are defined for 19 regions (under six Regional State Administrative Agencies plus Åland).

Each code consists of two parts, separated by a hyphen. The second part is two digits.

Åland, an autonomous region of Finland (also a former province), is also officially assigned its own country code in ISO 3166-1, with alpha-2 code .

Current codes

Subdivision names are listed as in the ISO 3166-2 standard published by the ISO 3166 Maintenance Agency (ISO 3166/MA).

ISO 639-1 codes are used to represent subdivision names in the following administrative languages:
 (fi): Finnish
 (sv): Swedish

In addition, the list also includes translation to English (en).

Subdivision names are sorted in Finnish alphabetical order: a–z, å, ä, ö.

Click on the button in the header to sort each column.

Regions

 Notes

Changes
The following changes to the entry have been announced by the ISO 3166/MA since the first publication of ISO 3166-2 in 1998:

Codes before Newsletter II-3

See also
 Subdivisions of Finland
 FIPS region codes of Finland
 NUTS codes of Finland

References

External links
 ISO Online Browsing Platform: FI
 Regions of Finland, Statoids.com

2:FI
ISO 3166-2
Finland geography-related lists